Baun may refer to:

People
 Aleta Baun, Indonesian environmental activist
 Alexander Baun (born 1995), Danish football player
 Bobby Baun (born 1936), Canadian ice hockey player
 John De Baun (1852–1912), Australian businessman
 Kyle Baun (born 1992), Canadian ice hockey player
 Stine Baun Eriksen (born 1995), Danish handball player
 Tine Baun (born 1979), Danish badminton player
 Zack Baun (born 1996), American American football player

Places

Other
 British Association of Urological Nurses